Nicodemo Domenico  "Little Nicky" Scarfo Sr. (March 8, 1929 – January 13, 2017) was a member of the American Mafia who became the boss of the Philadelphia crime family after the deaths of Angelo Bruno and Phil Testa.

During his criminal career, Scarfo had a murderous reputation, also engaging in organized crime activities such as drug trafficking and gambling. In 1988, he was convicted of multiple charges including conspiracy, racketeering and first degree murder. His trial was met with damaging testimonies of several informants, who had carried out his murders. Scarfo died in prison on January 13, 2017, while serving his 55-year sentence.

He was the father of Nicky Scarfo Jr., a Lucchese family soldier, who was sentenced in 2015 to 30 years in prison for security fraud, racketeering, and illegal gambling.

Early life
Scarfo was born on March 8, 1929, in Brooklyn, New York, to Philip and Catherine Scarfo, Italian immigrants from Naples and Calabria. At the age of 12, Scarfo and his family moved to South Philadelphia, where he worked as a day laborer and later graduated from Benjamin Franklin High School in 1947. He became an amateur boxer, fighting in small clubs throughout Philadelphia, earning himself a reputation for his aggressive temper in the ring. After failing to become a success in the boxing world, Scarfo joined his uncle Nicky Buck, a Philly Mob soldier, in illegal activities in Philadelphia. He also worked as a bartender at a club owned by his uncle while being apprenticed by Buck, alongside his two other uncles.

Criminal years
In 1954, Scarfo was proposed for membership into the Philadelphia crime family. He was inducted by then boss Joseph Ida at a ceremony held in New Jersey, alongside two of his uncles who were also inducted as full-fledged soldiers. Scarfo was reportedly arrogant and stubborn, having declined to marry the daughter of Consigliere Joe Rugnetta, leaving him embarrassed and disrespected, briefly causing friction within the family. In 1963, Scarfo pleaded guilty to manslaughter for fatally stabbing a longshoreman; he spent about six months in prison. After his release, he was sent to Atlantic City, New Jersey by Angelo Bruno to oversee the operations there. Scarfo served almost two years in prison from 1971 to 1973 for refusing to testify to the New Jersey State Commission of Investigation. He served time with boss Angelo Bruno and Genovese crime family members Gerardo Catena and Louis Manna, the latter of whom he formed a close relationship with.

In 1976, Atlantic City legalized gambling, and Scarfo prioritized gambling as his main source of income. At the time he was dispatched to Atlantic City, it was considered a backwater. However, its rise as a gambling mecca made Scarfo a powerhouse.

His cement contracting company "Scarf, Inc", which was shared with his nephew, received business as developers built new casinos in Atlantic City; Scarfo would intimidate businesses into buying from his company. In 1978, Scarfo and his associate, Nicholas "Nick the Blade" Virgilio, shot and murdered judge Edwin Helfant for refusing to cooperate with them and to help Virgilio receive a lighter sentence as he was facing murder charges, in exchange for $12,500. Scarfo acted as the getaway driver. Meanwhile, Virgilio fired numerous rounds into the judge as he dined with his wife in a restaurant. He made it a public execution and made him an example to anyone that wasn't willing to give him what he wanted. In 1979, criminal associate and contractor Vincent Falcone was shot twice and killed by Scarfo's nephew Phil Leonetti on Scarfo's orders, after making negative remarks about the company and Scarfo.

Power struggle
Longtime Boss Angelo Bruno was murdered in 1980. His murder was orchestrated by his Consigliere, Antonio Caponigro. Weeks later, Caponigro faced the consequence of killing a Boss without the approval of the American Mafia Commission. He was found shot dozens of times in a car trunk and $300 in bills were jammed in his mouth and anus as a sign of his own greed. Phil Testa became the new Boss of the Philadelphia crime family, appointing Scarfo as his Consigliere. However, his tenure as Boss would be a short one. Testa was killed by a nail bomb under his porch in 1981, on orders of his Underboss and drug trafficker Peter Casella and Capo Frank Narducci Sr., which later resulted in Narducci being gunned down and Casella being banished from the Mob and fleeing to Florida.

Testa's murder sparked a war within the family. Scarfo seized the top position for himself, promoting Salvatore Merlino as his Underboss and Frank Monte as his Consigliere. Scarfo would go on to lead the family for a decade with a bloody rampage, fueled by paranoia and aggression. Between August 1982 and January 1984, Scarfo was imprisoned in FCI La Tuna for gun possession. While in prison, Scarfo always had two bodyguards accompanying him; who were associates of the Mexican Mafia, whom he referred to as his “pistoleros”. During that time, aging Capo Harry Riccobene began to form another faction that opposed Scarfo. The war would cost him his little brother's life, his brother Mario to become a government informant and Riccobene himself to be given a life sentence for first degree murder.

In 1984, Scarfo ordered the death of Salvatore Testa, one of his Capos and top hitmen, as Testa's ambition and growing popularity made Scarfo feel threatened. Testa was the son of former Boss Phil Testa, who had been Scarfo's close friend and mentor. As a result of Salvatore Testa's murder, Scarfo gained a reputation for disloyalty, and several criminal organizations across the United States began to distrust him.

Downfall of Scarfo
In 1985, Scarfo plotted to extort $1 million from major commercial developer Willard Rouse, sending his soldier Nicholas Caramandi and another associate to do it. Rouse refused and immediately contacted the FBI. The FBI began a case to tackle Scarfo, sending an undercover agent to pose as a representative of Rouse. This led Caramandi, a notable and feared hitman, to cooperate and testify against the organization. In 1986, Caramandi was indicted for his role in the extortion case and decided to  testify in court. Between 1987 and 1989, Scarfo was convicted three times—for conspiracy, racketeering, and first-degree murder, being sentenced to consecutive prison terms of 14 years, 55 years and life, although the life sentence was later overturned. Scarfo's nephew, Phil Leonetti, who he had promoted to Underboss in 1986, also turned state's evidence in 1989 after a RICO conviction.

During the trial, Scarfo's son Mark Scarfo attempted suicide on November 1, 1988. Mark, then only 17 years old, had been taunted for years by classmates about his father's criminal activities. Increasingly despondent over his father's possible imprisonment, Mark Scarfo hanged himself in the office of his father's concrete supply company in Atlantic City. He was discovered by his mother, and paramedics were able to resuscitate him. He suffered cardiac arrest and his brain was deprived of oxygen. He entered a coma where he remained until his death in April 2014.

Death
Scarfo began his sentence at the Atlanta Federal Penitentiary. He was later transferred to the Federal Medical Center in Butner, North Carolina, where he died of natural causes on January 13, 2017. His register number was 09813–050.

References

1929 births
2017 deaths
Philadelphia crime family
American gangsters of Italian descent
American crime bosses
American people convicted of murder
People convicted of racketeering
People from Brooklyn
People of Calabrian descent
People convicted of murder by the United States federal government
Gangsters from Philadelphia
American people convicted of manslaughter
Prisoners and detainees of Pennsylvania
Prisoners who died in United States federal government detention
Gangsters sentenced to life imprisonment